Salari may refer to:

Salari, Fars, a place in Fars Province, Iran
Salari, Lorestan,  a village in Lorestan Province, Iran
Salari, Razavi Khorasan, a village in Razavi Khorasan Province, Iran